CDH Investment Bank (CDHIB), is an investment bank in Malawi. It is licensed by the Reserve Bank of Malawi, the central bank and national banking regulator.

Location
The headquarters and main branch of the bank are located at CDH House, 5 Independence Drive, in Blantyre, the financial and commercial capital of Malawi. The geographical coordinates of the headquarters of CDH Investment Bank are 15°47'19.0"S, 35°00'13.0"E (Latitude:-15.788611; Longitude:35.003611).

Overview
CDHIB is a medium-sized financial services provider in Malawi. , the bank's total assets were valued at MWK:154,005,233,000 (US$192 million), with shareholders' equity of MWK:15.995 billion (US$19.87 million).

History
CDHIB was founded in 1998 as Continental Discount House Limited (CDH), which has operated in the financial sector since August that year. In May 2011, CDH was granted a banking license by the Reserve Bank of Malawi. The institution dropped the discount house license it previously held, but continues to offer almost all services it used to under the discount house licence, like trading financial instruments and corporate financial advisory. It then rebranded to CDH Investment Bank. In April 2012, CDHIB commenced commercial and investment banking business by opening its main branch in Blantyre, the largest city in the country and a second branch in Lilongwe, the capital of Malawi.

Ownership
As of December 2018, the shares of stock of CDH Investment Bank are privately owned by the following corporate entities:

Branches
, the bank maintained networked branches at the following locations:

 CDH Branch: CDH House, 5 Independence Drive, Blantyre
 Capital City Banking Centre: CDH Investment Bank Centre, Lilongwe
 Lilongwe Banking Centre: City Mall Complex, Lilongwe

See also
 List of banks in Malawi
 Economy of Malawi
 Reserve Bank of Malawi

References

External links
 Website of CDH Investment Bank

Banks of Malawi
Banks established in 1998
Companies of Malawi
Economy of Malawi
1998 establishments in Malawi
Blantyre